Kamogawa may refer to:
Kamo-gawa or Kamo River, a river through Kyoto City
Kamogawa, Chiba, a city in Chiba Prefecture
Kamogawa Sea World
10143 Kamogawa, asteroid discovered 1994

See also 
Kamo River (Kyoto)